Devil Riders is a 1943 American Western film directed by Sam Newfield. It was the first film in Producers Releasing Corporation's Billy the Kid film series where Crabbe changed his name to "Billy Carson".

Plot
Billy and Fuzzy are in charge of the local branch of the Pony Express.  When a stagecoach line comes to town the Pony Express retains the weekly mail delivery contract whilst the stagecoach line takes freight and passengers.  When the stagecoach line decides to do a daily mail service Billy and Fuzzy initially welcome the competition.  However, two scheming businessman feel the stagecoach line would threaten their wealth and they plot to have the Pony Express and stagecoach line fight each other by each blaming the other for the sabotage done by the henchmen of the businessmen.

Cast 
Buster Crabbe as Billy Carson
Al St. John as Fuzzy Q. Jones
Patti McCarty as Sally Farrell
Charles King as Del Stone
John Merton as Jim Higgins
Kermit Maynard as Henchman Red
Frank LaRue as Tom Farrell
Jack Ingram as Henchman Turner
George Chesebro as Curley

Soundtrack 
Tex Williams and the Big Slicker Band - "She's Mine"
Tex Williams and the Big Slicker Band - "It Don't Mean Anything Now"

See also
The "Billy the Kid" films starring Buster Crabbe: 
 Billy the Kid Wanted (1941)
 Billy the Kid's Round-Up (1941)
 Billy the Kid Trapped (1942)
 Billy the Kid's Smoking Guns (1942)
 Law and Order (1942) 
 Sheriff of Sage Valley (1942) 
 The Mysterious Rider (1942)
 The Kid Rides Again (1943)
 Fugitive of the Plains (1943)
 Western Cyclone (1943)
 Cattle Stampede (1943)
 The Renegade (1943)
 Blazing Frontier (1943)
 Devil Riders (1943)
 Frontier Outlaws (1944)
 Valley of Vengeance (1944)
 The Drifter (1944) 
 Fuzzy Settles Down (1944)
 Rustlers' Hideout (1944)
 Wild Horse Phantom (1944)
 Oath of Vengeance (1944)
 His Brother's Ghost (1945) 
 Thundering Gunslingers (1945)
 Shadows of Death (1945)
 Gangster's Den (1945)
 Stagecoach Outlaws (1945)
 Border Badmen (1945)
 Fighting Bill Carson (1945)
 Prairie Rustlers (1945) 
 Lightning Raiders (1945)
 Terrors on Horseback (1946)
 Gentlemen with Guns (1946)
 Ghost of Hidden Valley (1946)
 Prairie Badmen (1946)
 Overland Riders (1946)
 Outlaws of the Plains (1946)

External links 

 ([Alternative link])

1943 films
1943 Western (genre) films
American black-and-white films
Billy the Kid (film series)
Producers Releasing Corporation films
American Western (genre) films
Films directed by Sam Newfield
Works about the Pony Express
1940s English-language films
1940s American films